Benin is a country in West Africa. It is bordered by Togo to the west, Nigeria to the east, and Burkina Faso and Niger to the north. A majority of the population live on its small southern coastline on the Bight of Benin, part of the Gulf of Guinea in the northernmost tropical portion of the Atlantic Ocean. The capital of Benin is Porto-Novo, but the seat of government is in Cotonou, the country's largest city and economic capital. Benin covers an area of 114,763 square kilometers and its population in 2015 was estimated to be approximately 10.88 million. Benin is a tropical, sub-Saharan nation, highly dependent on agriculture, with substantial employment and income arising from subsistence farming.

Notable firms 
This list includes notable companies with primary headquarters located in the country. The industry and sector follow the Industry Classification Benchmark taxonomy. Organizations which have ceased operations are included and noted as defunct.

See also 
 List of airlines of Benin
 List of banks in Benin

References 

 
 
Benin